This page lists the major power stations located in Inner Mongolia.

Non-renewable

Coal-based

Natural Gas-based

Renewable

Hydroelectric

Conventional

Pumped-storage

Wind
Inner Mongolia has the largest wind power capacity in China. The installed capacity are over 7,300MW in 2010.

References

Inner Mongolia
Buildings and structures in Inner Mongolia